, literally "Wallet Mobile", is the de facto standard mobile payment system in Japan. Osaifu-Keitai services include electronic money, identity card, loyalty card, fare collection of public transits (including railways, buses, and airplanes), or credit card. The term "Osaifu-Keitai" itself is a registered trademark of NTT Docomo.

The system was developed by NTT Docomo but the system is also supported by other mobile phone operators.  It uses Sony's Mobile FeliCa ICs.

Operators
NTT docomo Group: i-mode FeliCa
KDDI (au/Okinawa Cellular): EZ FeliCa
SoftBank Mobile: S! FeliCa
Willcom: WILLCOM IC Service

Advantages
FeliCa, developed by Sony, is the standard technology used for Japanese smart cards. Many of these cards accept Osaifu-Keitai (Mobile FeliCa) system as well, or plan to accept it in future. Osaifu-Keitai can provide more convenient services than plastic FeliCa cards. For instance, it can automatically recharge itself via the Internet, or provide the latest information. It can also be used as a ticket for an airplane or an event, by downloading an electronic ticket. Unlike plastic cards, a single Osaifu-Keitai phone may accept multiple applications, each equivalent to different cards.

Disadvantages
Osaifu-Keitai provides many functions on a single mobile phone. Therefore, there is a great risk if the phone is lost, broken, or stolen. Osaifu-Keitai basically functions even without radio transmissions, so the applications can not be terminated just by closing a phone account. A user has to contact each service provider to stop all the functions. There are some phones that can lock the functions via a phone call or an E-mail.

Since Osaifu-Keitai can function as identity card (such as member card, company card, or keycard), there is also a risk for those who authenticate it.

Services

See also
Mobile payment
Electronic money
FeliCa

External links
 Osaifu-Keitai from NTT DoCoMo official website
 EZ FeliCa from au official website
 S! FeliCa from SoftBank Mobile official website
 WILLCOM IC Service from WILLCOM official website
 FeliCa from Sony official website

Mobile telecommunication services
Mobile payments
NTT Docomo